Magic Kids was an Argentine cable channel which aired cartoons, anime and live shows aimed at kids and young teens. The channel was founded on January 12, 1995, and went defunct on May 24, 2006.

Widely regarded as one of the harbingers of a renewed interest for Japanese animation in Latin America during the 1990s, at its height the network had a variety of merchandise including a brand of soft drinks, toys and, the monthly Magic Kids Magazine.

Originally conceived a "The Big Channel", the idea was to create a channel aimed at very young kids as way to market Pramer's toy-lines. The channel was later re-branded as Magic Kids'''. At first it survived thanks by airing American series such as Power Rangers, X-Men and Spider-Man but later on shifted to Japanese anime series, as it was cheaper to license and would differentiate them from other American channels like Cartoon Network and Nickelodeon.

As the network grew it also started creating some original content, starting with the interactive game show A Jugar con Hugo, which premiered the year after the debut of the channel and stayed on practically until it was shut down. Afterwards came Nivel X, a weekly show base around video-game culture, hosted by Lionel Campoy and Natalia Dim and El Club del Ánime'', hosted at first by Leandro Oberto and later on by Mariela Carril.

At first, the channel was only available in Argentina, but soon, the channel started expanding to other countries. In Chile, regional cable operators like TV Cable Intercom started broadcasting the channel in 1995. However the push to expand was hasty, and Magic Kids failed to secure the rights to it most popular series outside Argentina. Most of its roster was replaced with much older less popular series that were more affordable. In addition to the 2001 Argentine crisis, it stopped broadcasting anime and began to lose its edge over their competitors. In early 2006, they stopped producing their own series, and in May of the same year, the signal finally went off the air alongside Plus Satelital as the company began to focus on brands with more international and regional value.

See also
 Locomotion (TV channel)
 The Big Channel

References

 Dated version of the Magic Kids Webpage at the Internet Web Archive (Spanish)

External links
 

Anime television
Anime and Cartoon television
Children's television networks
Defunct television channels
Latin American cable television networks
Television channels and stations established in 1995
Television channels and stations disestablished in 2006
Television in Argentina
Television stations in Argentina